Phractura clauseni is a species of catfish in the genus Phractura that lives in freshwater rivers across West Africa. It is named in honor of Danish ichthyologist Herluf Stenholt Clausen.

References

clauseni
Freshwater fish of West Africa
Fish described in 1963
Taxa named by Jacques Daget